Centennial Watershed State Forest is a Connecticut state forest of more than 15,000 acres with larger parcels located in the towns of Easton, Newtown, Redding, and Weston. Dozens of other properties are strung throughout much of Southwestern part of the state. In 2002, the lands were acquired from the Aquarion Water Company by the state in partnership with The Nature Conservancy. Those three entities continue to manage the property by committee. The forest was named in honor of the hundredth anniversary of the state forest system.

Recreation opportunities
Although most of the state forest acreage is off limits to the public and patrolled by Aquarion security officers, the forest offers opportunities for letterboxing, hiking on the Aspetuck Valley Trail and Saugatuck Trail, and shoreline fishing on the Saugatuck Reservoir. Access to the forest is by permit only.

References

External links
Centennial Watershed State Forest Connecticut Department of Energy and Environmental Protection
Saugatuck Trail Map: Centennial Watershed State Forest Connecticut Department of Energy and Environmental Protection
Aspetuck Valley Trail Map: Centennial Watershed State Forest Connecticut Department of Energy and Environmental Protection

Connecticut state forests
Parks in Fairfield County, Connecticut
Easton, Connecticut
Newtown, Connecticut
Redding, Connecticut
Weston, Connecticut
Protected areas established in 2002
2002 establishments in Connecticut